Kamann is a surname. Notable people with the surname include:

 Karl Kamann (1899–1959), German operatic bass-baritone
 Uwe Kamann (born 1958), German politician

See also
 Kaman (surname)